The International Emmy Award for Best Non-Scripted Entertainment is presented by the International Academy of Television Arts and Sciences as part of the International Emmy Awards, given to the best non-scripted entertainment programs: "reality show", "game show" or gender programs, initially produced and aired outside the United States.

Rules & Regulations 
According to the rules of the International Academy, non-scripted entertainment programs are television program devoted primarily to entertain, or entertain and inform, with unscripted dialogue (i.e. reality show, variety show, game show, awards show, docu-reality, etc.). The program should fit the minimum format length of a televised half-hour time slot, only one episode can represent the series and multiple submissions from the same series are not permitted.

Winners and nominees

2000s

2010s

2020s

References

External links
International Emmy Awards

Non-Scripted Entertainment